Ajaysinhji Jadeja  ( born 1 February 1971), known as Ajay Jadeja, is an Indian former professional cricketer, who was a regular member of the Indian cricket team between 1992 and 2000. He played 15 Test matches and 196 One Day Internationals for India.

Personal life 
Jadeja was born into an erstwhile Nawanagar royal family. which has a cricketing pedigree. His relatives include K. S. Ranjitsinhji, after whom the Ranji Trophy is named, and K. S. Duleepsinhji, for whom the Duleep Trophy is named. Jadeja's Father  Daulatsinhji Jadeja was a 3 time Member of Parliament from Jamnagar Loksabha. His mother is a native of Alappuzha in Kerala. Jadeja is married to Aditi Jaitly, the daughter of Jaya Jaitly and the couple have two children,  and Ameera.

He began his schooling at the Bharatiya Vidya Bhawan, New Delhi. He was subsequently sent to a Rajkumar College in Rajkot. He did not like boarding school, and in a particular year he ran away from there 13 times. He finally settled down at the Sardar Patel Vidyalaya, New Delhi, from where he completed his schooling. He met Aditi Jaitly here. He later went for higher studies to Hindu College, Delhi.

International career 
Jadeja was a regular in the Indian cricket team between 1992 and 2000, playing 15 Test matches and 196 One Day Internationals. He was regarded as one of the best fielders in the Indian team in his time. One of his most memorable innings was his cameo in the 1996 Cricket World Cup quarter-final In Bengaluru against arch rivals Pakistan when he scored 45 off 25 balls, including 40 from the final two overs by Waqar Younis. Jadeja, along with Mohammed Azharuddin, holds the record for the highest one-day partnership 4th and 5th wicket, set against Zimbabwe and Sri Lanka respectively. Jadeja was also renowned for his remarkable fielding and was considered one of the safest pair of hands in the Indian team during his tenure.

Another memorable occasion of his career was taking 3 wickets for 3 runs in 1 over against England in Sharjah to win the match for India. Jadeja has captained India in 13 One-day matches. One of  favorite hunting grounds was the Chinnaswamy Stadium in Bangalore, the venue of the quarter-final against Pakistan in the 1996 World Cup. The last time Jadeja played in a One Day International was against Pakistan in the Pepsi Asia Cup on 3 June 2000. He scored 93 in a game that India eventually lost. Jadeja was the top scorer hitting 8 fours and 4 sixes.

Match-fixing scandal
Jadeja's cricketing achievements were later overshadowed by a 5-year ban for match-fixing. The ban was later quashed by the Delhi High Court on 27 January 2003, making Jadeja eligible to play domestic and international cricket. Jadeja had approached the Delhi High Court on 2 February 2001, challenging the BCCI order imposing the five-year ban on the basis of the K. Madhavan Committee recommendations. He was back playing Ranji in 2003.

After cricket
In 2015, Jadeja was appointed as the main coach for Delhi cricket team but he resigned from the post. Jadeja is currently a cricket commentator.

Popular culture 
Jadeja acted in the 2003 movie Khel with Sunny Deol and Sunil Shetty. He also acted in the 2009 movie, Pal Pal Dil Ke Ssaat, directed by V.K.Kumar.

Jadeja worked for Zee News as a cricket anchor, along with Zaheer Abbas, the former Pakistan cricket captain, during the 2003 ICC Cricket World Cup. He reprised the role for the 2007 ICC Cricket World Cup. Later, he signed to work as a cricket analyst with NDTV India and NDTV 24*7.

Jadeja was a contestant on the celebrity dance show Jhalak Dikhhla Jaa in its first season. He also appeared on the TV show Comedy Circus.

He did a cameo in Abhishek Kapoor's film Kai Po Che! acting as himself in a cricket commentator role.

References 

 Ajay Jadeja, Sanjeev Kapoor to put on their dancing shoes on Sony
 I admire the way Ajay deals with everything: Aditi Jaitly
 I’ll keep trying: Ajay Jadeja 
 All-rounder, on and off field

External links 

 

Indian cricketers
1971 births
Living people
India Test cricketers
Indian cricket captains
India One Day International cricketers
Cricketers at the 1992 Cricket World Cup
Cricketers at the 1996 Cricket World Cup
Cricketers at the 1999 Cricket World Cup
Delhi cricketers
Haryana cricketers
Jammu and Kashmir cricketers
North Zone cricketers
Rajasthan cricketers
Cricketers at the 1998 Commonwealth Games
Indian cricket commentators
Recipients of the Arjuna Award
Gujarati people
People from Jamnagar
Cricketers from Gujarat
Gujarati sportspeople
Indian cricket coaches
Cricketers who have acted in films
Cricketers banned for corruption
Commonwealth Games competitors for India